Carmel Muscat (born 1 November 1961) is a Maltese former cyclist. He competed in the individual road race and team time trial events at the 1980 Summer Olympics.

References

External links
 

1961 births
Living people
Maltese male cyclists
Olympic cyclists of Malta
Cyclists at the 1980 Summer Olympics
Place of birth missing (living people)